Grandes éxitos y fracasos is a compilation series by Spanish hard rock band Extremoduro. It features re-recorded versions of the band's hits, as well as some album cuts.

Later, it was released a Box set that included both compilation albums, the DVD Gira 2002 and an instrumental compilation album called Canciones sin voz.

Grandes éxitos y fracasos (Episodio primero)

Chart performance

Certifications

Grandes éxitos y fracasos (Episodio segundo)

Chart performance

Box Set

The box set contains the two episodes, the DVD performance of the 2002 Tour and an instrumental compilation album called Canciones sin voz.

Canciones sin voz 

Canciones sin voz is an instrumental compilation album only included in Grandes éxitos y fracasos Box Set.

Track listing

Presentación
No me calientes, que me hundo
Jesucristo García
Pepe Botika
Necesito droga y amor
Tu corazón
Sol de invierno
La vereda de la puerta de atrás
A fuego
Ama, ama, ama y ensancha el alma
Papel secante
Amor castúo
Decidí
Quemando tus recuerdos
Bribribliblí
De acero
Historias prohibidas
Salir
Puta
Standby

References

External links 
 Extremoduro official website (in Spanish)

Extremoduro albums
2004 albums
Spanish-language compilation albums